The 1945 Brown Bears football team represented Brown University during the 1945 college football season.

In their second season under head coach Charles "Rip" Engle, the Bears compiled a 3–4–1 record, and were outscored 141 to 123 by opponents. R.D. Williams was the team captain.  

Brown played its home games at Brown Stadium in Providence, Rhode Island.

Schedule

References

Brown
Brown Bears football seasons
Brown Bears football